Douglas is an abandoned town in eastern Smith County, located in the U.S. state of Texas.
, near the old Jamestown-Tyler road. In 1936, the town had one dwelling and four buildings which were part of a school for black students, as well as a cemetery and farms. The school was later incorporated into the Arp Independent School District, and Douglas was essentially abandoned by the 1970s.

References

External links
 Handbook of Texas entry on Douglas

Geography of Smith County, Texas
Ghost towns in East Texas